Khurmi is a jamoat in north-western Tajikistan. It is part of the city of Panjakent in Sughd Region. The jamoat has a total population of 10,451 (2015). It consists of 10 villages, including Khurramobod (the seat), Jangal and Ozodagon.

Notes

References

Populated places in Sughd Region
Jamoats of Tajikistan